The F7R engine is used in Renault Clio Williams, Megane Coupe and Renault Sport Spider. The engine was created because displacement limit for FIA World Rally Championship Group A was 2000 cc and more power could be extracted from F7P (1764cc) engine with more capacity.

Differences between F7P  (1.8L 16V)  and F7R include increased capacity to 1998 cc, bigger valves, more aggressive cam profile, different crank, larger piston bore (82.7mm compared to F7P of 82.0mm), longer stroke (93.0mm compared to 83.50mm) different exhaust manifold, oil cooler, etc. All this results in more low-down torque and more power. Also F7R is coupled to uprated gearbox (JC5) instead of JB3(1.8 16V). This version was coupled with Sadev 6-speed manual or 7-speed Hewland sequential gearbox (stock Williams 5-speed manual). Later evolutions of rally engine had destroked crankshaft with  stroke and  bore diameter to keep the 1998 cc capacity.

Engine was also used in BTCC Williams Renault Laguna. Engine was heavily modified by Sodemo and produced up to 320hp (Naturally aspirated).

Specifications

The engine has the following specifications:

Induction capacity: 1998 cc
Bore x stroke 82.7 x 93 mm
Cylinders: 4
Valves: 16
Injection: multipoint fuel injected
Compression ratio: 9.8:1
Maximum power:  ISO  (Megane at 6000 rpm, Williams at 6100 rpm)
Maximum torque Williams F7R:  ISO 17.5 mkg DIN (at 4500 rpm) 
Maximum torque Megane F7R:  ISO 18.2 mkg DIN (at 4500 rpm)
Redline: Williams 6500 rpm, Megane 6800 rpm

See also
 List of Renault engines

Renault engines